Gods on Voodoo Moon is the first recording and release by White Zombie, released independently as an EP in November 1985. It was their only release with Paul "Ena" Kostabi on guitar and Peter Landau on drums.

Production
The six songs, including "Black Friday" and "Dead or Alive", were all recorded in one session and in one take each.

Release and reception
The EP was first released only on vinyl. The songs "Black Friday" & "Dead Or Alive" were recorded during the same sessions but were excluded from the vinyl pressings due to lack of space. A cassette version was released in 1989 on Caroline Records featuring the two unreleased tracks. Because the lack of funds at the time only 300 copies of vinyl were pressed at Macola Records Hollywood, California, 100 of which were sold while the others are in the possession of the band members.

The EP was rereleased by the Numero Group on June 3, 2016, as part of the It Came From NYC retrospective box set. Remastered by Jay Yuenger, the set was available on 5 vinyl discs with a free digital download in 320 KBps MP3 format, or as a 3-CD set. This release includes the two tracks previously only available on cassette.

It was re-released on Record Store Day, in April 2017, on red (Zombie Blood) vinyl and white (Zombie Pus) vinyl, on 750 copies total.

Track listing

Personnel
Adapted from the Gods on Voodoo Moon liner notes.

White Zombie
 Paul Kostabi (as Ena Kostabi) – electric guitar
 Peter Landau – drums
 Sean Yseult – bass guitar, photography
 Rob Zombie (as Rob Straker) – vocals, illustrations

Production and additional personnel
 Gary Dorfman – engineering
 White Zombie – production

Release history

References

External links 
 

White Zombie (band) albums
1985 EPs
1985 debut albums
Self-released EPs